David Alexander (22 April 1869 – 14 January 1941) was a Scottish footballer, who played for East Stirlingshire, Darwen, Accrington and Scotland.

References

External links

London Hearts profile

1869 births
1941 deaths
Footballers from North Lanarkshire
Association football forwards
Scottish footballers
Scotland international footballers
East Stirlingshire F.C. players
Darwen F.C. players
Accrington F.C. players
English Football League players
People from Cambusnethan
Sportspeople from Wishaw